is a Japanese singer and voice actress from Hyōgo Prefecture who is affiliated with 	Sony Music Artists. She began her career as an idol under Stardust Promotion in 2008, and in 2010 she became a member of Shiritsu Ebisu Chugaku. Following her departure from the group in 2011, she became a member of various idol groups and bands. After starting a voice acting career, she was cast as Yu Takasaki in Love Live! Nijigasaki High School Idol Club in 2020. She is also known for her roles as Momoe Sawaki in Wonder Egg Priority, and Suzune Miyama in Selection Project.

Biography
Yano was born in Hyōgo Prefecture on March 5, 1997. She began her activities as an idol in 2008 when she became a member of the group Piecees. The following year, she became a member of the group Momonaki. In 2010, she became a member of Shiritsu Ebisu Chugaku, before leaving the group in 2011.

Following her departure from Shiritsu Ebisu Chugaku, Yano moved to Sony Music Artists and began using the stage name Hinaki Tsukikage. She became involved in various groups and activities, such as being a member of the anime collaboration cafe Shirobaco and serving as lead vocalist of the band Dusty Fruits Club. She also started a voice acting career, appearing in a number of video games and foreign dubs. In 2020, she was cast in her first major anime role as Yu Takasaki in Love Live! Nijigasaki High School Idol Club. In 2021, she played the roles of Kitasan Black in Uma Musume Pretty Derby 2nd Season, Momoe Sawaki in Wonder Egg Priority, and Suzune Miyama in Selection Project. In 2022, Yano was one of the winners of the Best New Actress Award at the 16th Seiyu Awards.

Filmography

Anime
2019
The Price of Smiles as Emma

2020
Love Live! Nijigasaki High School Idol Club as Yu Takasaki

2021
Uma Musume Pretty Derby 2nd Season as Kitasan Black
Wonder Egg Priority as Momoe Sawaki
Selection Project as Suzune Miyama

2022
Love Live! Nijigasaki High School Idol Club 2nd Season as Yu Takasaki

2023
Kizuna no Allele as Halle

References

External links
Official website 

1997 births
Japanese voice actresses
Living people
Nijigasaki High School Idol Club members
Seiyu Award winners
Shiritsu Ebisu Chugaku members
Voice actresses from Hyōgo Prefecture